The Music Bank Chart is a record chart on the South Korean KBS television music program Music Bank. Every week, the show awards the best-performing single on the chart in the country during its live broadcast.

In 2019, 38 singles achieved a number one on the chart and 28 music acts were awarded first-place trophies. "Boy with Luv" by BTS won for 7 weeks and is the song with the most wins of the year. The song also acquired the highest point total on the April 26 broadcast with a score of 13,007.

Chart history

Notes

References 

2019 in South Korean music
South Korea Music Bank
Lists of number-one songs in South Korea